Senator Fry may refer to:

Donald C. Fry (born 1955), Maryland State Senate
Jack Fry (fl. 2010s), Oklahoma State Senate
Joseph Fry Jr. (1781–1860), Pennsylvania State Senate

See also
Henry Frye (born 1932), North Carolina State Senate
William P. Frye (1830–1911), U.S. Senator from Maine from 1881 to 1911